Mobarakabad (also Romanized as Mobārakābād; also known as Mobark Abade Koochesfehan) is a village in Luleman Rural District, Kuchesfahan District, Rasht County, Gilan Province, Iran. At the 2006 census, its population was 358, in 110 families.

References 

Populated places in Rasht County